Ulting Wick is a  garden, situated at Ulting near Maldon in Essex. It is  centred around three listed black Essex barns and a 16th-century farmhouse. It is open to the public, by appointment, under the National Garden Scheme.

The garden has been described as "a garden jewel" and was voted one of the country’s top 100 gardens to visit by Garden News magazine. Thousands of tulips are planted every year, in November and December, and in the summer they are followed by tender exotics and late-summer dahlias.

In July 2021 the garden, and its owner Philippa Burrough, were featured on BBC's Gardeners' World.

References

External links 
 

Gardens in Essex